Mount Wilbur may refer to:

 Mount Wilbur (Montana) in Montana, United States
 Mount Wilbur (Alaska) in Alaska, United States
 Mount Wilbur (Antarctica) in Antarctica